Coffey County Airport  is a county-owned public-use airport located seven miles (11 km) north of the central business district of Burlington, a city in Coffey County, Kansas, United States.

Although most U.S. airports use the same three-letter location identifier for the FAA and IATA, Coffey County Airport is assigned UKL by the FAA but has no designation from the IATA.

Facilities and aircraft 
For the 12-month period ending September 9, 2005, the airport had 20,050 aircraft operations, an average of 54 per day: 99.8% general aviation and 0.2% military. At that time there were 32 aircraft based at this airport: 88% single-engine, 3% multi-engine and 9% ultralight.

References

External links

Airports in Kansas
Buildings and structures in Coffey County, Kansas